Trolleybuses in São Paulo provide a portion of the public transport service in Greater São Paulo, in the state of São Paulo, Brazil, with two independent trolleybus systems. The SPTrans (São Paulo Transportes) system opened in 1949 and serves the city of São Paulo, while the Empresa Metropolitana de Transportes Urbanos de São Paulo (EMTU) system opened in 1988 and serves suburban areas to the southeast of the city proper. Worldwide, São Paulo is one of only two metropolitan areas possessing two independent trolleybus systems, the other being Naples, Italy.

History
The urban network now owned by SPTrans opened on 22 April 1949, the first trolleybus system to open in Brazil. The municipally owned system was operated by the Companhia Municipal de Transportes Coletivos (Municipal Public Transport Authority) (CMTC) until 1994, when it was semi-privatized, with a new municipal authority, SPTrans, maintaining public ownership of the system but with operation contracted out to private companies through a competitive bidding. At the start of privately run operation, there were three different concessionaires for different parts of the SPTrans, ex-CMTC trolleybus network. The SPTrans network was much larger at that time.

The SPTrans system comprises 13 lines (two of them currently suspended) and is operated with 199 trolleybuses by a concessionaire, Ambiental Transportes Urbanos.  SPTrans owns and maintains the infrastructure, such as overhead wires, substations, passenger terminals and depots/garages. Ambiental is responsible for purchasing new vehicles, but ownership of vehicles passes to SPTrans eight years from time of purchase. Ambiental was awarded the concession to operate the service in SPTrans Zone 4 (also known as the Eastern Zone), both trolleybus and motorbus, in 2011, after the purchase of Himalaia Transportes.

The EMTU trolleybus system opened on 3 December 1988, (sometimes given as 19 November 1988, when free public service began operating).  It currently has six lines, serving the São Mateus–Jabaquara Metropolitan Corridor, which links São Paulo with the ABC Region cities of Diadema, São Bernardo do Campo, Santo Andre and Mauá in Greater São Paulo.  These lines are also operated by a concessionaire, Metra, under the supervision of EMTU.  Metra was awarded the contract in 1997.

SPTrans lines 

The last two of these lines are the ones currently suspended; they are presently being operated by diesel powered buses.

SPTrans current fleet 
As at 2014, the SPTrans trolleybus fleet was as follows:

EMTU lines

Service on all lines is operated with a mix of trolleybuses and diesel buses.

EMTU current fleet 
As at 2014, the EMTU trolleybus fleet was as follows:

See also

List of trolleybus systems in Brazil
Transport in São Paulo

References

External links

 SPTrans website 
 Metra website 
 Trolleybus city: Sao Paulo (SPT) and Trolleybus city: São Paulo (EMTU) at Trolleymotion (German, with automated translation to English and other languages available on-site) 
 

SPTrans
Transport in São Paulo
São Paulo
São Paulo
1949 establishments in Brazil